is a Japanese former gymnast who competed in the 1992 Summer Olympics and in the 1996 Summer Olympics.

He is the father of Hitomi Hatakeda and Chiaki Hatakeda, members of Japan's women's national team and candidates for the 2020 Olympic Games in Tokyo.

References

1972 births
Living people
Japanese male artistic gymnasts
Olympic gymnasts of Japan
Gymnasts at the 1992 Summer Olympics
Gymnasts at the 1996 Summer Olympics
Olympic bronze medalists for Japan
Olympic medalists in gymnastics
Asian Games medalists in gymnastics
Gymnasts at the 1990 Asian Games
Gymnasts at the 1994 Asian Games
Asian Games gold medalists for Japan
Asian Games silver medalists for Japan
Asian Games bronze medalists for Japan
Medalists at the 1990 Asian Games
Medalists at the 1994 Asian Games
Medalists at the 1992 Summer Olympics
Medalists at the World Artistic Gymnastics Championships
Universiade medalists in gymnastics
Universiade bronze medalists for Japan
Medalists at the 1997 Summer Universiade
20th-century Japanese people
21st-century Japanese people